Rajab Otukile Mahommed (born 28 June 1997) is a Botswana boxer. He competed in the men's flyweight event at the 2020 Summer Olympics. He lost to Yuberjen Martínez of Colombia in the first round.

References

External links
 

1997 births
Living people
Botswana male boxers
Olympic boxers of Botswana
Boxers at the 2020 Summer Olympics
Place of birth missing (living people)
African Games gold medalists for Botswana
African Games competitors for Botswana
Competitors at the 2019 African Games
Commonwealth Games competitors for Botswana
Boxers at the 2018 Commonwealth Games
African Games medalists in boxing